The Shirabad Waterfall is a waterfall in the  Alborz mountain range, at the village of Shirabad in the Fenderesk District of Golestan Province, northern Iran.

It is in a forested area, 7 kilometers south of Khanbebin.

Description
Shirabad Waterfall is in the form of a stairway cascade and includes 12 large and small waterfalls.

There are several caves nearby, which are home to the critically endangered Gorgan salamander.

See also
 

Waterfalls of Iran
Landforms of Golestan Province
Alborz (mountain range)